Wreck Cove, originally known as Tibbos Hill, is a settlement in Newfoundland and Labrador. It is located in Fortune Bay, south west of Belleoram. The first postmistress was Olive Sheppard. The community is now a part of the town of St. Jacques-Coomb's Cove.

Populated places in Newfoundland and Labrador